Rajinikanth is an Indian actor. In a career spanning nearly four decades Rajinikanth has won so many awards from numerous associations. He is a seven time recipient of the Tamil Nadu State Film Awards out of which six are under Best Actor category. He also received numerous awards from Cinema Express and Filmfans' Association for his on-screen performances and off-screen contributions. He won his only Filmfare award for Nallavanuku Nallavan in 1984. At the 45th International Film Festival of India (2014), Rajinikanth was conferred with the "Centenary Award for Indian Film Personality of the Year".

Civilian honors

National Film Awards

Tamil Nadu State Government Award

Maharashtra State Film Award

International Film Festival of India

Nandi Awards

NDTV Award

Cinema Express Awards

Filmfans Association Awards

Filmfare Awards South
Rajinikanth won the Filmfare Award for Best Actor – Tamil in 1984 from a total of eighteen nominations, his first and only win in the category.

South Screen Awards

Tamil Nadu State Film Awards

Vijay Awards

See also
 Rajinikanth filmography

References 

Rajinikanth
Lists of awards received by Indian actor